The Sydney Metro Metropolis Stock is a class of electric multiple units that operate on the Sydney Metro network. Built by Alstom as part of their Metropolis family, the trains are the first fully automated passenger rolling stock in Australia as well as the first single-deck sets to operate in Sydney since their withdrawal from the suburban rail network in the 1990s. A total of 176 carriages, making up 22 6-car sets, entered service in 2019 with the opening of the Metro North West Line. 23 more sets will be rolled out for the City & Southwest extension, commencing service in 2024, which will expand the Metropolis fleet to 45 sets.

History 
Prior to the introduction of services, a full-scale model of the new train was built for public display, including at the annual Sydney Royal Easter Show. It consisted of the front carriage, and was approximately 75% of the length of the final design, having two doors instead of three.

The sets were manufactured at Alstom's rolling stock facility in India, with the first train arriving on 26 September 2017.

In February 2018, dynamic testing on the first of the trainsets began. Testing was done on brakes, passenger information displays, lighting and door operation.

In November 2019, MTS was awarded a 10-year contract to operate the rolling stock on the metro network. To commemorate the new contract, 23 additional Metropolis sets were ordered, bringing the total fleet to 45 sets (with extensions to 8 cars likely to happen if sufficient demand warrants it) by the time the City & Southwest extension is scheduled to open in 2024.

The rolling stock officially entered service on 26 May 2019 on the Metro North West Line.

Design 

Each single-deck train features two dedicated areas for prams, luggage and bicycles. There are three doorways per side per carriage and no internal gangway doors between the carriages. In a 6-car configuration the trains have a seating capacity of 378 people, with a total capacity of 1,100. The trains utilise Alstom's trademark Urbalis 400 Grade-of-Automation signalling system that ensures trains are capable of driving and operating automatically at all times without onboard staff, including door closing, obstacle detection and dealing with emergency situations.

The trains feature longitudinal 'bench-style' seating per carriage (similar to most metro rapid-transit/subway trains), with distinctly coloured seats for priority and disabled passengers.  Seats in wheelchair spaces can fold up in order to fit prams and wheelchairs. A doorway-status light is installed above each doorway, which illuminates white when the doors are fully closed, green when the doors are fully open, and flashes in red when the doors are opening or closing.

Features of the Metropolis sets include CCTV cameras, internal passenger information display (PID) screens and digital voice announcements. The PID screens display the name of the next station, along with icons for available transport mode interchanges. The sets are also fitted with air conditioning and emergency help points. There are also USB charging ports at the end of cars 01 and 02.

The Metropolis sets are operated via a control centre based at Rouse Hill. In the event the system is otherwise unable to operate the train, an engineer can manually take over the train's functions.

Service formation 
The 270 Alstom Metropolis carriages will form 45 six-car sets. Individual vehicles are numbered as follows:

 Cars 01 & 02 are control trailer cars.
 Cars 03 & 04 are non-control motor cars with pantographs.
 Cars 05 & 06 are non-control motor cars.

Car 01 always faces the Tallawong end, while car 02 always faces the Chatswood end.

In the event that extensions to 8 cars happens if sufficient demand warrants the contract, two infill carriages  will be added between cars 05 and 06.

References

External links 

Specifications

Electric multiple units of New South Wales
Train-related introductions in 2019
Sydney Metro
Alstom multiple units
1500 V DC multiple units of New South Wales